The 1973 John Player League was the fifth competing of what was generally known as the Sunday League.  The competition was won for the second consecutive year by Kent County Cricket Club.

Standings

Batting averages

Bowling averages

See also
Sunday League

References

John Player League
Pro40